The Fort Cornwallis Lighthouse is a lighthouse in Fort Cornwallis, George Town, Penang, Malaysia. It is currently under the management of the Maritime Authority of Malaysia.

History 
The lighthouse was constructed by the British Malaya government in 1882 as the Fort Point Lighthouse with a cost of £10,224. In 1914–1928, the lighthouse underwent renovation and its name was changed to Penang Harbour Lighthouse.

Architecture 

See also 

 List of tourist attractions in Penang
 List of lighthouses in Malaysia

References 

1882 establishments in British Malaya
Lighthouses in Malaysia
Lighthouses completed in 1882
Buildings and structures in Penang